Hanwha Qcells (commonly known as simply Qcells) is a major manufacturer of photovoltaic cells. The company is headquartered in Seoul, South Korea, after being founded in 1999 in Bitterfeld-Wolfen, Germany, where the company still has its engineering offices. Qcells was purchased out of bankruptcy in August 2012 by the Hanwha Group, a large South Korean business conglomerate. Qcells now operates as a subsidiary of Hanwha Solutions, an energy and petrochemical company.

Qcells has manufacturing facilities in China, Malaysia, South Korea, and the United States. The company was the sixth-largest producer of solar cells in 2019, with shipments totalling 7.3 gigawatts.

History 
In 1999, Anton Milner, Reiner Lemoine, Holger Feist, and Paul Grunow established Qcells in an area of Thalheim, Saxony-Anhalt, a part of former East Germany that had seen 50,000 people lose their jobs after German reunification. On 23 July 2001, the company produced its first working polycrystalline solar cell on its new production line in Thalheim. Qcells would grow to become one of the world's largest solar cell manufacturers, employing over 2,000 people and encouraging other companies to open facilities in the surrounding area, which would come to be known as Germany's "Solar Valley."

The company went public on 5 October 5, 2005, listing on the Frankfurt Stock Exchange. High share prices during the initial public offering poured money into the company and made the founders wealthy. Lemoine died in 2006, and shortly thereafter, Fest and Grunow left the company to go back into research. Only Milner remained and served as the company's CEO.

In 2005, Qcells established the CdTe PV manufacturer Calyxo. In November 2007, Qcells agreed a deal with Solar Fields, which intellectual property and assets were merged into Calyxo's newly established subsidiary Calyxo USA. In 2011, Solar Fields took over Calyxo.

In 2008, Qcells acquired 17.9% stake in Renewable Energy Corporation. This stake was sold in 2009. At the same year, Qcells' subsidiary Sontor merged with a thin-film company Solarfilm.

In June 2009, the company acquired Solibro, a joint venture it had established in 2006. Solibro manufactured thin-film solar cells based on copper-indium-gallium-diselenide. These modules were marketed until the sale of Solibro to Hanergy in 2012.

Qcells was hit hard by the Great Recession in late 2008, with share prices slipping from over 80 euros to under 20. In response, the company laid off 500 employees. Milner resigned as CEO in early 2010, and by the end of the year, the company's finances appeared to stabilize. Just a few months later, in 2011, the global solar cell market crashed, with production overcapacity driving prices extremely low. Qcells saw sales slide by around 1 billion euros, ran a loss of 846 million euros and on 3 April 2011, the company filed for bankruptcy.

In August 2012, the Hanwha Group, a large South Korean business conglomerate, agreed to acquire Qcells, saying that it presented synergy opportunities. In 2010, Hanwha had purchased a 49.99% share in Chinese manufacturer Solarfun which had been renamed Hanwha SolarOne. SolarOne had been producing solar cells for Qcells under contract.

Due to high costs, production in Germany ceased in 2015, with Hanwha moving the work to its SolarOne facilities in China and newly opened manufacturing facilities in Malaysia and South Korea. In 2019, Qcells opened another manufacturing facility in the United States.

In recent years, Hanwha has since worked to simplify the structure of units, merging SolarOne into Qcells in December 2014, merging Qcells and the company's Advanced Materials (petrochemicals) group in 2018, Qcells & Advanced Materials acquired a solar company operated by the Hanwha Chemicals group in 2019, and in 2020 Hanwha Qcells & Advanced Materials merged with Hanwha Chemical to form the Hanwha Solutions group.

Operations 
Qcells develops and produces mono- and polycrystalline silicon photovoltaic cells and solar panels. It produces and installs PV systems for commercial, industrial, and residential applications and provides EPC services for large-scale solar power plants.

The company's engineering offices are located at the original headquarters in Thalheim, German. Production facilities are located in Qidong in China, Cyberjaya in Malaysia; Eumseong and Jincheon in South Korea and Dalton, Georgia in the United States.

See also 
 List of photovoltaics companies
 Photovoltaic array
 Photovoltaics
 Theory of solar cells
 Thin-film cell

References

External links 

 

Technology companies established in 1999
Engineering companies of South Korea
Manufacturing companies based in Seoul
Photovoltaics manufacturers
Thin-film cell manufacturers
Silicon wafer producers
Hanwha subsidiaries
Companies formerly listed on the Nasdaq
South Korean brands
South Korean companies established in 1999